The Beauty Prize is a lost 1924 American silent comedy film directed by Lloyd Ingraham and starring Viola Dana.

Synopsis
A manicurist wins a beauty contest while posing as a debutante, and reveals her deception via a new craze, the radio.

Cast
 Viola Dana as Connie Du Bois
 Pat O'Malley as George Brady
 Eddie Phillips as Eddie Schwartz
 Eunice Murdock Moore as Madame Estelle (credited as Eunice Vin Moore)
 Edward Connelly as Pa Du Bois
 Edith Yorke as Ma Du Bois
 Joan Standing as Lydia Du Bois
 Frederick Truesdell as Eric Brandon

References

External links

1924 films
American silent feature films
Metro-Goldwyn-Mayer films
American black-and-white films
Films directed by Lloyd Ingraham
1924 comedy films
Silent American comedy films
Lost American films
1924 lost films
Lost comedy films
1920s American films